MercExchange is a technology development and on-line auction company.  Their founder's name is Thomas G. Woolston.

Licensees

The following companies have licensed MercExchange technology as of April 2007. 

 AutoTrader.com
 Channeladvisor
 uBid
 Overture
 ReturnBuy

Issued US Patents

  Consignment nodes
  Method and apparatus for using search agents to search plurality of markets for items
  Facilitating internet commerce through internetworked auctions
  Facilitating electronic commerce through two-tiered electronic markets and auctions
  Generating and navigating streaming dynamic pricing information

Patent dispute

MercExchange was engaged in a legal dispute over an alleged unauthorized use of one of its patents by eBay, via that auction house's "Buy It Now" feature that allow customers to bypass the normal auction procedures. In the 2003 case eBay Inc. v. MercExchange, L.L.C., a jury found that eBay had infringed upon MercExchange's patent and that eBay's infringement caused $35 million in damages to MercExchange, later reduced to $25 million.  However, in a 2006 US Supreme Court ruling, MercExchange was found not to be automatically entitled to a court order blocking use of the technology, due to no indication that 'irreparable harm' had been suffered by the company, that the company had never actually used the invention itself and that it had been more than willing to license the technology to others.

The District Court issued an order denying MercExchange a permanent injunction in December 2007,  and the two parties reached a settlement, the terms of which are confidential, in 2008.

References

Online auction websites of the United States